Robert Rich, 3rd Earl of Warwick (28 June 1611 – 29 May 1659 in London), supported the Royalist cause in the English Civil War (his father the 2nd Earl supported the Parliament of England).

Biography
Robert Rich was the eldest son of Robert Rich, 2nd Earl of Warwick and Frances, daughter of Sir William Hatton. He was made a Knight of the Bath on 1 February 1625 at the coronation of King Charles I, along with his uncle St John Blount.

Rich, as Baron Rich, of Leighs, Essex, joined King Charles I at York, but never bore arms; and the fine imposed upon him by Parliament was remitted at his father's petition.

His father, the second earl, died in April 1658, passing on the earldom.  Rich died on 29 May 1659, and was buried in Felsted, Essex. His only son, also Robert, predeceased him by 15 months dying of consumption. The earldom passed to the 3rd Earl's brother Charles.

Family
Rich married Lady Anne Cavendish, the daughter of William Cavendish, 2nd Earl of Devonshire, on 9 April 1632 at Battersea, Surrey. Their only child, Robert, married Frances Cromwell, daughter of the Lord Protector Oliver Cromwell in 1657, but died of consumption within three months of the marriage on 16 February 1658, leaving no children. His widow married secondly Sir John Russell, 3rd Baronet.

Robert Rich married secondly Anne Cheeke, daughter of Sir Thomas Cheek and Essex Rich. Their children were:
Anne who married Thomas Barrington of Barrington Hall. Essex,  eldest son and heir of Sir John Barrington, 3rd Baronet, who predeceased his father.
Mary who married Henry St John, 1st Viscount St John on 11 December 1673 and died in 1678, giving birth to their only son, Henry, Viscount Bolingbroke.
Essex Rich, who married Daniel Finch, 2nd Earl of Nottingham on 16 June 1674.

References

Notes

Sources 
 
Attribution

|-

1611 births
1659 deaths
17th-century English nobility
Earls of Warwick (1618 creation)
Robert
English MPs 1628–1629
English MPs 1640–1648